Spor Toto Akhisar Stadium, also known as Akhisar Arena, is a stadium in Akhisar, Turkey. It opened to public 28 January 2018, when Akhisarspor faced Antalyaspor in the Süper Lig. The stadium has a capacity of 12,139 spectators. It replaced Akhisarspor's previous home, Manisa 19 Mayıs Stadium.

References

Football venues in Turkey
Sport in Manisa
Süper Lig venues
Akhisarspor
Sports venues completed in 2018